CBS Reality is a British free-to-air television channel broadcast in Europe, the Middle East and Africa.

History
CBS Reality was launched as Reality TV on 1 December 1999 as a joint-venture between UPCtv and Zone Vision. In 2005, Liberty Global, owner of UPC, bought Zone Vision. In 2006, they decided to put all their channels under the unified "Zone" brand. Reality TV became Zone Reality, Reality Extra in UK became Zone Reality Extra on 26 June 2006.

On 1 August 2012, Chellomedia revealed that the European version of Zone Reality would be rebranded into CBS Reality. In Europe, Zone Reality was rebranded on 3 December 2012. AMC Networks acquired Chellomedia on 2 February 2014. Chellomedia was rebranded by AMC Networks International on 8 July 2014. On 4 November 2020, it was rebranded by ViacomCBS.

CBS Reality is available in HD in Poland since 23 September 2019.

UK and Ireland
Reality TV was launched by UPCtv and Zone Vision on the Sky EPG in the UK and Ireland on 10 October 2002. In February 2006, an additional channel called Reality Extra was launched.

On 14 September 2009, it was revealed that CBS Studios International had struck a joint venture deal with Chellomedia to launch six CBS-branded channels in the UK and Ireland during 2009. On 16 November 2009, the channel rebranded as CBS Reality and CBS Reality +1.

, CBS Reality is available on Freeview and Freesat in the United Kingdom. A timeshift channel, CBS Reality +1, was available on YouView , but was removed on 2 June 2015. In Ireland, the channels are available on Sky Ireland.

In addition to their slot on Freeview Channel 66, a number of CBS Reality shows can be found simulcast daily on various Local Television channels in the UK, such as Local TV Liverpool (Freeview channel 7).

On 30 June 2022, the British arm of the AMC-Paramount partnership revised their channel line-up with nearly all CBS branding being dropped and a new channel called Legend taking CBS Justice's slot on a number of services and Horror's programming.

Availability

Cable
 Caiway : Channel 104
 Com Hem : Channel 71
 Cosmote TV : Channel 452
 Hot : Channel 48
 Kabel Noord : Channel 222
 Naxoo : Channel 224
 NOS and Nowo : Channel 19
 RCS & RDS : Channel 28
 UPC : Channel 647
 UPC : Channel 392
 Virgin Media : Channel 130
 Virgin Media : Channel 148 and Channel 201 (+1)
 Vodafone : Channel 303

IPTV
 Moja TV : Channel 13
 Open IPTV : Channel 652
 T-Mobile : Channel 283
 Vodafone Casa TV : Channel 112

Online
 FilmOn: CBS Reality and CBS Reality +1
 Virgin TV Anywhere : VirginMediaTV.ie
 Virgin TV Anywhere : VirginMedia.com

Satellite
 Astra 28.2°E : 11344 V 27500 5/6 (Free-to-air)
 beIN : Channel 162
 Canal Digitaal : Channel 410 (UK version) and Channel 411 (+1, UK version)
 DStv : Channel 132
 Freesat : Channel 135 and Channel 136 (+1)
 Sky  and Sky : Channel 146 and Channel 246 (+1)
 Yes : Channel 64
 Zuku TV (Kenya): Channel 127

Terrestrial
 Freeview : Channel 67

Logos

See also
CBS Drama
CBS Justice
Paramount International Networks
AMC Networks International

References

External links
CBS Reality Europe
CBS Reality UK

AMC Networks International
Paramount International Networks
Television channels and stations established in 1999
Television channels in the Netherlands
English-language television stations in the United Kingdom
1999 establishments in the Netherlands